August Tobro (12 March 1887 Aru Parish, Tartu County – ?) was an Estonian politician. He was a member of V Riigikogu.

References

1887 births
Members of the Riigikogu, 1932–1934
Year of death missing